In Her Place is a 2014 Canadian-South Korean film directed and written by Albert Shin. The film follows a wealthy woman who moves in to the countryside home of a pregnant teenage girl and her mother and waits to adopt the unborn child.

It premiered on September 4, 2014, in the Toronto International Film Festival's Discovery program.

Plot 
Inspired by Korean culture's strong stigma against adoption, the film stars Gil Hae-yeon and Ahn Ji-hye as a mother and daughter living on a farm in South Korea. When the teenage daughter becomes pregnant, a woman (Yoon Da-gyeong) arrives from Seoul to propose a secret adoption, conditional on her staying with them for the duration of the pregnancy so that she can hide the adoption when she returns to Seoul after the baby's birth.

Cast

Production 
The film was shot entirely in Korea at Shin's family farm. Regarding his inspirations for the film, Shin said:

Release

Critical reception 
On review aggregation website Rotten Tomatoes, the film holds an approval rating of 80% based on 5 reviews, and an average rating of 7/10.

Variety's Jay Weissberg described the film as "an acutely observed psychodrama from sophomore helmer Albert Shin, powered by three sterling performances." Radheyan Simonpillai in NOW Magazine called it "an expertly plotted drama that packs a paralyzing emotional gut punch." The Toronto Star's Linda Barnard wrote, "Making good use of the mist-shrouded rural South Korea setting to create moody tension, Shin's film builds slowly to a shattering finale that shocks as much as it surprises."

Accolades 
The film was included in the list of Canada's Top Ten feature films of 2014, selected by a panel of filmmakers and industry professionals organized by Toronto International Film Festival. Shin was awarded the Jay Scott Prize at the 2014 Toronto Film Critics Association Awards for the film.

References

External links
 
 

2014 films
Canadian drama films
South Korean drama films
Canadian pregnancy films
Films directed by Albert Shin
Films about Korean Canadians
2010s Canadian films
2010s South Korean films